Divorce Corp is a 2014 book and American documentary film produced and directed by Joseph Sorge and written by Joseph Sorge, James D. Scurlock, Philip Sternberg and Blake Harjes. The film is narrated by "Dr. Drew" Pinsky. The film explores corruption within the family court system of the United States.

Reception
As of February 2020, Divorce Corp. had received an 81% positive rating among audience views on Rotten Tomatoes and a 44% Rotten rating with critics, based on 9 reviews.

References

External links
 
 

Documentary films about law in the United States
2014 films
2014 documentary films
2010s English-language films